Mokpo station is a station on the Honam Line in Mokpo, South Jeolla Province. It is the westernmost railway station in South Korea. This station is the last stop on the Honam Line. Being located in the southwestern part of the Korean peninsula, it is used by customers who visit Jeju Island, Heuksan Island, and Hong Island in connection with KTX.

References

External links
Korea Train eXpress
Route Map

Korea Train Express stations
Railway stations in South Jeolla Province
Railway stations opened in 2015
2015 establishments in South Korea
Mokpo